Austria originally planned to participate in the Eurovision Song Contest 2020 with the song "Alive" written by Vincent Bueno, David "Davey" Yang, Felix van Göns and Artur Aigner. The song was performed by Vincent Bueno. On 12 December 2019, the Austrian broadcaster Österreichischer Rundfunk (ORF) announced that they had internally selected Vincent Bueno to compete at the 2020 contest in Rotterdam, Netherlands, while "Alive" was presented to the public on 5 March 2020.

Austria was drawn to compete in the second semi-final of the Eurovision Song Contest which took place on 14 May 2020. However, the contest was cancelled due to the COVID-19 pandemic.

Background

The Austrian national broadcaster,  (ORF), broadcasts the event within Austria and organises the selection process for the nation's entry. ORF confirmed their intentions to participate at the 2020 Eurovision Song Contest on 25 May 2019. In  and since , ORF has held an internal selection to choose the artist and song to represent Austria at the contest.

Before Eurovision

Internal selection 
Artists were nominated by the ORF Eurovision Song Contest Team led by ORF chief editor Stefan Zechner, which collaborated with music expert Eberhard Forcher who worked on the selection of the Austrian entries since 2016, to submit songs to the broadcaster. On 12 December 2019, "Alive" performed by Vincent Bueno was announced by ORF as the Austrian entry for the Eurovision Song Contest 2020. Bueno previously attempted to represent Austria at the Eurovision Song Contest in 2016 by competing in the national final with the song "All We Need Is That Love". After being selected to represent Austria in the Eurovision Song Contest 2020, Bueno said, "Wow, even thinking about the fact that I am going to participate in the song contest gives me goosebumps [...] it is breathtaking and formidable. Let’s go Austria!" "Alive" was selected from three shortlisted entries by Forcher and the ORF Eurovision Team, which also included the song "Judgement Day" performed by Thea Devy. Devy would later compete in the 2020 Serbian national final with the same song but performed in the Serbian language.

"Alive" was written by Vincent Bueno himself together with David "Davey" Yang, Felix van Göns and Artur Aigner. In regards to the song, Bueno stated: "The song itself has undergone massive evolution and got a good push in the final sprint. I worked with very young producers and composers, who will definitely be involved in the Austrian music scene in the future. While the song was being created, everyone on the team was able to experience how much the song was evolving, especially when everyone freed themselves from their own egos and opened up to each other."

At Eurovision
According to Eurovision rules, all nations with the exceptions of the host country and the "Big Five" (France, Germany, Italy, Spain and the United Kingdom) are required to qualify from one of two semi-finals in order to compete for the final; the top ten countries from each semi-final progress to the final. The European Broadcasting Union (EBU) split up the competing countries into six different pots based on voting patterns from previous contests, with countries with favourable voting histories put into the same pot. On 28 January 2020, a special allocation draw was held which placed each country into one of the two semi-finals, as well as which half of the show they would perform in. Austria was placed into the second semi-final, which was to be held on 14 May 2020, and was scheduled to perform in the second half of the show. However, due to 2019-20 pandemic of Coronavirus, the contest was cancelled.

References 

2020
Countries in the Eurovision Song Contest 2020
Eurovision